Furipteridae is family of bats, allying two genera of single species, Amorphochilus schnablii (smoky bat) and the type Furipterus horrens (thumbless bat). They are found in Central and South America and are closely related to the bats in the families Natalidae and Thyropteridae. The species are distinguished by their reduced or functionless thumbs, enclosed by the wing membranes, and their broad, funnel-shaped ears. They are insectivorous and can live in many different kinds of environments. They have greyish fur, and a small nose-leaf. Like many bats, they roost in caves.

Taxonomy

Genus Amorphochilus
Amorphochilus schnablii, smoky bat
Genus Furipterus
Furipterus horrens, thumbless bat

References

 
Bats of South America
Bats of Central America
Bat families
Taxa named by John Edward Gray